Glenn Yealland also known as "Glen Yealland" (born in Sydney, New South Wales) is an Australian former rugby league player who played for the Penrith Panthers in the National Rugby League competition.

References

Australian rugby league players
Living people
Year of birth missing (living people)
Rugby league players from Sydney
Penrith Panthers players
Sportsmen from New South Wales